Senna Hegde is an Indian film director and screenwriter who works in Malayalam and Kannada cinema. His debut film was the 2016 docudrama 0-41* and his second film was the romantic comedy, Katheyondu Shuruvagide.

Biography
Senna was born  in the town of Kanhangad, in northern Kerala. He graduated with a Master's Degree in Information Technology from Queensland University of Technology, Brisbane, and went on to work as a business analyst in the United States for four years. Then he moved to the Middle East, where for the next eight years he worked for various international advertising agencies, telling stories in 30-second spots. He returned to India in 2014. 

Senna worked on Rakshit Shetty's script team for his 2014 film Ulidavaru Kandanthe. Back in his hometown, Senna turned his hand to making his own films. He wrote the script for his debut feature film, 0-41*, in three days. A docudrama set in Kanhangad, it follows the lives of players on two rival volleyball teams. The six-member cast were not professional actors, which gave their performance what Anurag Kashyap described as an "innocence". The film made its world premiere at the 11th 'Cinema on the Bayou' film festival in Lafayette, Louisiana on 26 January 2016. It has played at other festivals, but has not been released commercially.

Senna's second film, Katheyondu Shuruvagide is a Kannada-language romantic comedy starring Diganth and Pooja Devariya, with Ashwin Rao Pallaki and Shreya Anchan in supporting roles.

On the occasion of Onam in 2020, he announced his next Malayalam film Thinkalazhcha Nishchayam. The film won the Kerala State Film Award for Second Best Film and Senna Hegde received the award for Kerala State Film Award for Best Story in the 51st Kerala State Film Awards. The film also won the Best Feature Film in Malayalam in the 68th National Film Awards.

Filmography

Accolades

References

External links
 

People from Kasaragod district
Kannada screenwriters
Living people
Kannada film directors
Malayalam film directors
Year of birth missing (living people)